{{Infobox religious biography
| religion           = Islam
| name               = Jalal al-Din al-Mahalli
| era                = 
| image              = جلال الدين المحلي.png
| image_size         = 
| caption            = 
| title              = 
| birth_date         = 23 September 1389 CE / 791 AH
| birth_place        = Cairo
| death_date         = 5 July 1460 CE / 864 AH
| death_place        = Cairo
| denomination       = Sunni
| Maddhab            = Shafi'i
| creed              = Ash'ari
| region             = Egypt
| main_interests     = Fiqh, Tafsir, Sharia, Aqidah
| notable_ideas      = 
| Sufi_order         = 
| works              = Tafsir al-Jalalayn, Sharh al-Minhaj
| influences         = Siraj al-Din al-MulaqqinIbn Hajar al-AsqalaniSiraj al-Din al-BulqiniSharaf al-Din al-MunawiIbn Arabi

Imam Al Haramayn
| influenced         = Al-SuyutiZakariyya al-Ansari
| module             = 
}}
Abū ‘Abd Allāh Muḥammad ibn Shihāb al-Dīn Jalāl al-Dīn al-Maḥallī (1389–1460 CE); aka Jalaluddin was an Egyptian renowned mufassir and a leading specialist in the principles of the law in Shafi'i jurisprudence. He authored numerous and lengthy works on various branches of Islamic Studies, among which the most important two are Tafsir al-Jalalayn and Kanz al-Raghibin, an explanation of Al-Nawawi's Minhaj al-Talibin, a classical manual on Islamic Law according to Shafi'i fiqh.

His Tafsir Tafsir al-Jalalayn'' is considered one of the most famous and popular interpretations of the Qur'an. The mission of preparing the Tafsir was initiated by Jalal ad-Din al-Maḥalli in 1459 and completed after his death by his pupil Jalal ad-Din as-Suyuti in 1505, thus its name, which means "Tafsir of the two Jalals". It is recognised as one of the most popular exegeses of the Qur'an today, due to its simple style and its conciseness, as it is only one volume in length.  The work has been translated into many languages including English, French, Bengali, Urdu, Persian, Malay/Indonesian, Turkish, and Japanese. There are two English translations.

References

Asharis
Shafi'is
Sunni Sufis
Egyptian imams
Egyptian Sunni Muslims
Egyptian Sufis
Quranic exegesis scholars
Sunni Muslim scholars of Islam
Sunni imams
Shafi'i fiqh scholars
15th-century Egyptian people
15th-century jurists
15th-century scientists
1389 births
1460 deaths